The 2020 Shoot Out (officially the 2020 BetVictor Snooker Shoot Out) was a professional ranking snooker tournament held from 20 to 23 February 2020 at the Watford Colosseum in Watford, England. It was the 13th ranking event of the 2019–20 snooker season. It was played under a variation of the standard rules of snooker. The event was the third of four events sponsored by BetVictor, making up the 2020 European Series.

The defending champion was Thailand's Thepchaiya Un-Nooh, who defeated England's Michael Holt 1–0 (74–0) in the 2019 final. In 2020, Un-Nooh was beaten by Peter Lines in the second round. For the second consecutive year, Holt reached the final, where he defeated Zhou Yuelong 1–0 (64–1). There were four century breaks during the event, the highest being a 133 by Thor Chuan Leong. There was a prize fund of £171,000, £50,000 of which was awarded to the winner.

Tournament format
The 2020 Snooker Shoot Out professional snooker tournament was held at the Watford Colosseum in Watford, England, between 20 and 23 February 2020. It was the 10th edition of the Snooker Shoot Out tournament, the first of which was held in 1990 as the 1990 Shoot-Out. The 2020 iteration is the 13th ranking event of the 2019–20 snooker season following the World Grand Prix and preceding the Players Championship. Each match in the Snooker Shoot Out is played over a single frame. The 2020 event had 128 participants from the World Snooker Tour and additional players were selected as wildcard entries. The event was organised by the World Professional Billiards and Snooker Association (WPSA) and the World Snooker Tour.

The tournament was played using a variation of the traditional snooker rules. All matches were played over a single , each of which lasted up to 10 minutes. The event featured a variable ; shots played in the first five minutes were allowed 15 seconds while the final five had a 10-second timer. Rather than a coin toss, a lag is used to choose which player . In the event of a draw, each player receives a shot at the  this is known as a "blue ball shootout". The event was broadcast by Eurosport.

Prize fund
The event had a prize fund of £171,000, of which the winner received £50,000. The event was the third of the "European Series", all of which were sponsored by BetVictor. The other tournaments in the series were the European Masters, German Masters and Gibraltar Open. The player accumulating the most prize money over the four events received a bonus of £150,000. The breakdown of prize money for this year is shown below:

 Winner: £50,000
 Runner-up: £20,000
 Semi-final: £8,000
 Quarter-final: £4,000
 Last 16: £2,000
 Last 32: £1,000
 Last 64: £500
 Last 128: £250 (prize money at this stage will not count towards prize money rankings)
 Highest break: £5,000
 Total: £171,000

Tournament summary

Early rounds
The 2020 Snooker Shoot Out began on 20 February and the first round was played during the first two days. The tournament's opening match featured defending champion Thepchaiya Un-Nooh, who had defeated Michael Holt in the final of the 2019 event. Un-Nooh defeated Maltese player Alex Borg 63–17. The match between Daniel Wells and Bai Langning finished at 72–72 and Wells won the blue-ball shootout. Despite trailing 37–1 to Alfie Burden, Soheil Vahedi made a break of 36 to force a shootout, which he won. Three-time world champion Mark Selby lost in the opening round to Sunny Akani 54–18 while reigning world seniors champion Jimmy White lost to Matthew Stevens 71–39. Three amateur players qualified for the second round of the competition; Scotland's Dean Young defeated David Grace 35–29 and Irish player Ross Bulman defeated 2018 Snooker Shoot Out winner Michael Georgiou 21–28. In an all-amateur first-round match, 15 year-old Robbie McGuigan was defeated 15–50 by European under-18 champion Aaron Hill.

Two female players were invited into the draw. Nutcharut Wongharuthai played one shot in her match against Thor Chuan Leong, who made a total clearance, scoring 133, the highest  of the event. Twelve-time women's world champion Reanne Evans also lost in the first round to Ian Burns. The 2019 Snooker Shoot Out runner-up Michael Holt played Amine Amiri, who had not won a frame on tour all season. Amiri was ahead but failed to realise every shot must hit a cushion.

The second round of the tournament was held on 22 February. Defending champion Thepchaiya Un-Nooh was defeated by Peter Lines 11–79. Ronnie O'Sullivan, who had entered the event for the first time since 2015, lost 66–30 to Billy Joe Castle. The Masters finalist Ali Carter was defeated by Brandon Sargeant 63–68. All three amateur players won their second-round matches;  Aaron Hill defeated world number eight Kyren Wilson with a break of 47, Dean Young defeated Liam Highfield and Ross Bulman beat Andrew Pagett. Anthony Hamilton defeated top-16 player David Gilbert 62–50.

Later rounds
The remaining rounds were played on 23 February. The final day featured the remaining 32 players playing in four rounds with a break between each round. Two top-16 players, Jack Lisowski and Barry Hawkins lost in the third round to Zhou Yuelong and Ben Woollaston respectively.

The fourth round began with 2017 winner Anthony McGill defeating Shaun Murphy. Woollaston completed a whitewash of Jamie Clarke 96–0. In a frame consisting of only 34 points, Mei Xiwen defeated Mike Dunn 22–12. The semi-final lineup included three Chinese players; Zhou Yuelong defeated Xiwen, Lyu Haotan defeated Anthony McGill, and Yan Bingtao defeated Anthony Hamilton. The other semi-finalist was Michael Holt, who defeated Ben Woollaston 19–7. The semi-finals were played from 9 pm; in the first match, Michael Holt defeated Yan Bingtao 59–16. The second semi-final finished with a 44–33 win for Zhou Yuelong over Lyu Haotian.

The final was played between Michael Holt and Zhou Yuelong, both of whom were playing in their second ranking final; Holt had reached the event final the previous year while Zhou had reached the 2020 European Masters final earlier in the season. The winner of the Shoot Out progressed to the Players Championships that followed it. Holt scored a break of 42 and won the final 64–1; This was Holt's first full ranking event victory in his 24-year professional career. He said the tournament's format allowed him to "play on my instinct and then play my best".

Tournament draw

Top half

Section 1

Section 2

Section 3

Section 4

Bottom half

Section 5

Section 6

Section 7

Section 8

Finals

Final

Notes

Century breaks 
A total of four century breaks were made during the event. The highest was a 133 made by Thor Chuan Leong.

 133  Thor Chuan Leong
 120  Chang Bingyu
 107  Jak Jones
 101  Xiao Guodong

References

External links
 

2020
2020 in snooker
2020 in English sport
2020
February 2020 sports events in the United Kingdom
Shoot Out